Biscarrosse – Parentis Airport (ICAO code: LFBS) is located at Parentis-en-Born in Landes département of Nouvelle-Aquitaine region at 3,5 km south-east of Biscarrosse.

A campus of the École nationale de l'aviation civile (French civil aviation university) is located on the aerodrome.

Facilities 
The airport has three runways:

See also 
 List of airports in France
 Flying club
 Directorate General for Civil Aviation (France)

References 

Airports in Nouvelle-Aquitaine